Walter Irving Scott (July 1, 1895 – May 12, 1995) was an American musician, cardsharp and amateur magician. His glowing reputation among magicians and card men revolves around his time as a card cheat and a single demonstration of sleight-of-hand to some of the era's best magicians in New York in 1930. He lived out his last years in Rhode Island as a music teacher. Scott spent his formative years perfecting several difficult sleights of card manipulation in order to work as a cardsharp in card games throughout America. He participated in several different types of swindles and hustles. Eventually turning to a music career he was asked to perform one more demonstration. This single event created a legend within the magic community that continues to this day.

Early life
Born in Providence, Rhode Island on July 1, 1895, he was the son of an English engineer, Edward Augustus Scott, and his Scottish wife Jessie Barnes Smith. In 1899 Jessie left her husband, after enough of his self-indulgent ways, with her four children, Jesse, Edward, the 4-year-old Walter and his sister Florence.

The young Scott showed no natural qualities and drifted around with no particular purpose in mind. Then one day he found himself baffled by a neighbors card trick. He began studying card sleights and magic and entered some talent contests when he was 12. As the years passed his interest at manipulating cards for the stage turned into manipulating them for the card table. While he never directly talked about how he learned his trade Scott occasionally stressed the importance of personal tuition and mentioned the name Walter Holman, whom he met aged 16 or 17, from Boston. Holman was according to Scott "The best second and bottom dealer", and taught him the second and bottom deals.

Aged 17, Scott began to travel the states to find out "what the cardsharps actually do".

In December 1919, he joined the Providence branch of the National Conjurers Association, stating on his application he was an amateur magician and 'card manipulator'. It was here he met Edward Gilland McGuire, a fellow magician. McGuire had served in World War I but having been injured returned to Providence and took up an interest in magic. McGuire realised that Scott's skills owed more to the gaming room than the magic store. He began to see Scott's skills as a personal asset to allow him entry into a more privilege world of magicians.

Music career
Scott gave up working with cards in 1924 to focus on his love of music. He played the steel guitar. He had been playing since 1912 and with the increased popularity of Hawaiian bands found more opportunities to play professionally. Teaching himself, with some help from Hawaiian entertainers playing American theaters, he began touring with a band and appearing in Hawaiian shows and a stock theatre company. He enjoyed writing music and wrote his own and that of other band members.

During these years Eddie McGuire had been in correspondence with T. Nelson Downs. He talked at length about the greatest cheat he, or anyone else, had ever come across. This cardsharp was a mysterious player named 'Scott'. These letters raise some questions, such as why in 1922 McGuire was still talking to Downs about 'second dealing' specifics having already met Scott who he had alluded to being an excellent second dealer. Around the time Scott was touring with his band McGuire also wrote Downs telling him that Scott performed his music just for the fun of it. In 1929 he talked of watching Scott hustling other players at a game in Block Island. It is suggested that McGuire was creating the Phantom legend from the very beginning, from getting information on the second deal and feeding it to Scott to maintaining the idea of a 'high class bootlegger' and professional cardsharp.

During this period Scott married his first wife, Edith Paulson. A showgirl at the Oxford Hotel, Worcester. Scott called her 'one of the prettiest girls in all the world". They had spent six years together before getting married. Unfortunately, like his father before him and his brother, he was "playing around", and the marriage did not last long.

The Phantom of the Card table
While Scott occupied himself with his music, McGuire had been boasting to the magicians in New York about his other skills, claiming he knew a card cheater who could beat the lot of them.
Eventually Downs asked McGuire to set up a demonstration and it was arranged for June 14, 1930. Scott had nothing to gain from going to New York and made the trip largely as a favour to McGuire.
Some of the finest card men of the era had gathered in the home of Al Baker. T. Nelson Downs was there and others included Cardini and Max Holden. Scott proceeded to impress some of the world's most knowledgeable and skilled sleight of hand artists with his supreme skills. He astonished them for the rest of the evening with feats of cardmanship they had only dreamt about. He performed feats of advanced sleights, dealing poker hands, card cheating and repeated these effects again and again, sometimes blindfolded.

In the July 1930 issue of The Sphinx, the most prestigious US conjuring journal, Max Holden stated: "Without a doubt Walter Scott is the cleverest man with a pack of cards in the world."

After performing again for Cardini at his home, where a mysterious photo of 'The Phantom' with his hood still on originated (most likely taken by Cardini himself), the general attitude among the 'New York Inner Circle' was that Walter Scott was the new king of cards. An almost supernaturally skilled cardsman.

After New York
The main person affected with Scott's newfound fame and praise was Dai Vernon. 'The Professor' is still considered one of the greatest card manipulators in the history of conjuring.
The young Vernon often spent a lot of time on the road searching for legendary gamblers and cheaters and originators of new sleights or classic moves. He was the one card worker of note not among those for Scott's New York performance. Even his friend Eddie McLaughlin, who was there, spoke of Scott's amazing performance.

In the aftermath of the evening McGuire acted as an intermediary and seems to have taken pleasure in his newfound power over the revered Vernon who wanted an audience with Scott. McGuire had spent the last decade trying to circle with some of the top professionals. He used his money, and his considerable knowledge, to assist other performers and constantly expand his knowledge of magic and secret sleights.

However he was never able to get close to two of the best, Dai Vernon or Sam Horowitz. So McGuire got close to a magician both men admired, Max Malini, and through clever use of his association with Malini got to Horowitz. With his knowledge of Scott, McGuire had leverage and a worth to the top cardmen. For months before the June demonstration he had been giving some notes on Scott's work to Cardini.

In 1931, he released a collection of manuscripts involving aspects of Scott's work which became known as The Phantom of the Card Table. Around thirty copies were released selling for as much as $50 each (approx $500 in today's currency). Through his drip feeding of notes to Horowitz and Cardini he got Vernon to start calling. McGuires replies contained nothing of value and only forced Vernon to keep writing. In the correspondence he prodded Vernon and talked up Scott's achievements and skills. It was a turnaround that McGuire must have enjoyed, now all the secretive magicians were looking to him for answers.

As time passed and secrets slowly leaked McGuire's frustration grew with his fading control. Vernon had dropped the interest in Scott for a while to find 'the center deal' and in 1932 he released the Twenty Dollar Manuscript that contained a blindfolded poker routine and the Vernon Automatic Second Deal.

McGuire's plan to gain Vernon's confidence had failed and now he suspected Vernon was spreading information on Scott's work. McGuire retaliated with puff pieces in journals and wild stories of his own life. He wrote of how fantastic Scott was and assaulted Vernon's credibility and skill level when compared. In 1933, however, McGuire stopped his correspondence with Nelson Downs and disappeared from the magic community for unknown reasons. With him no longer pushing the legend, Walter Scott passed out of interest as well.

Discovery
Throughout the subsequent years the legend of the Phantom only grew however. In 1951, Arthur T. Johnson, a magician from New York, produced an edition of The Phantom of the Card table and handed it out anonymously at a magician's convention so that the material would not be in danger of being forgotten.

In August 1956, Scott, now 'rediscovered', was the headline act at the New England Magicians Convention. Due to the returned focus on Scott and a misattributed comment about him, Dai Vernon was not enthusiastic. Nor did it appear were the patrons of the show. While he appeared age 61 the main reason he was not widely applauded was not the rigours of age but that many there didn't appreciate what he was doing. Scott was not a magician with funny lines, instead he was showing real life situations. His skills were not suited to producing four aces at the end of a trite story but how to get what you need in a dangerous environment. He closed his show by asking anyone who was interested in his work to talk to him afterwards. It was the only convention lecture he ever gave.

Some that took on Scott's offer to see the work more closely after the show were magician Ray Goulet  and magician Herb Zarrow. Goulet said Walter Scott was the best second and bottom dealer he had ever seen. Another who saw Scott at this time was Slydini who was very impressed. Finally, the legendary Ed Marlo, met Scott at his home and they spent hours talking and demonstrating skills to each other. Later Marlo said: "It turned out, that we met a Presence, not a Phantom, and he lived up to the superlatives that everybody heard but were reluctant to believe".

However, once again he faded from the small limelight he had amassed until finally, after moving to America in 1983, British magician Gazzo, found Scott once more. He had returned to Rhode Island and was a music teacher. None of his friends knew he was a magician or even that he played cards but, with Gazzo's enthusiasm and skill for the moves in The Phantom at the Card Table, Scott finally revealed his side of the story and the tale of his life.

He said that, despite all his talk of being good friends and the man's generosity, that Eddie McGuire was one of the worst men he had ever met. That on the night of the famous demonstration he was a little drunk and was lured by booze and women than any claim to fame or praise.He talked of his life as card cheat and the various hustles and scams he was a part of. His friendship with Gazzo grew and strengthened for the years after their first meeting. Gazzo became his apprentice and only student, and in turn spread his works across the magic community.

When asked about all the rumours, myths and half-truths surrounding his life, and many from his own mouth, Scott simply stated to Gazzo:

'' "The truth is this. I was always a good bottom dealer. I was always an expert second dealer. Now those are two foundations you have to stand on. That's the story. Walter Scott as I saw him was a good bottom dealer, a second dealer and could riffle the cards very well." "

Scott died on May 12, 1995. He was ninety-nine years old.

Legacy
Scott's performance in 1930 set the standard for card men of the era. Finally an example of a perfect deal was a reality. The emergence of gambling 'exposé' act owes much to Scott's performance. Scott proved that practice makes perfect and it was out of that era that a new generation of 'gambling experts', such as John Scarne, emerged. His story and the legend that surrounds it, and his skills, is a driver even today for the top cardsharps to excel and perfect the sleights he made his money, and his name, with.

References

American magicians
1895 births
1995 deaths
Musicians from Providence, Rhode Island